Amal Sen was a Bangladeshi politician. He was the founding president of the Workers Party of Bangladesh.

Sen was born in Afra village, Narail on July 19, 1914. His family were zamindars. The ancestral home of his family was located at Bakri village, Bagherpara Upazila, Jessore District. Sen graduated in chemistry from Brajalal College in Khulna.

In 1933, after having graduated from college, he became a member of the Communist Party of India. He took part in the struggle against British rule over India. Sen was the leader of Tebhaga movement in Narail.

Sen became a leader of the East Pakistan Communist Party (Marxist-Leninist). Sen led a split from the EPCP(M-L) in 1971. Sen was a resistance organizer during the Bangladesh Liberation War. The EPCP(M-L) led by Sen and Nazrul Islam was one of the groups participating in the Coordination Committee of the Bangladesh Liberation Struggle set up in Calcutta. The Sen-Nazrul Islam faction set up the Bangladesh Communist Solidarity Committee. In 1972 he became the general secretary of the Bangladesh Communist Party (Leninist), a new open party into which the Amal Sen-Nazrul Islam-led EPCP(M-L) had merged. He became the general secretary of the United Communist League in 1986. Between 1992 and 2000 he served as president of the re-united Workers Party of Bangladesh, after 2000 he remained a member of the Central Committee of the party.

Sen spent a total of 19 years in prison, linked to his political activism. Sen died at Dhaka Community Hospital on January 17, 2003.

External links
News report on 2018 Amal Sen Memorial Fair in Jessore
News report on 2019 remembrance of Amal Sen by 14 Party Alliance
News report on 2020 Amal Sen Memorial Fair

References

1914 births
2003 deaths
Workers Party of Bangladesh politicians